The Bridgeport Covered Bridge is located in Bridgeport, Nevada County, California, southwest of French Corral and north of Lake Wildwood.  It is used as a pedestrian crossing over the South Yuba River. The bridge was built in 1862 by David John Wood. Its lumber came from Plum Valley in Sierra County, California. The bridge was closed to vehicular traffic in 1972 and pedestrian traffic in 2011 due to deferred maintenance and "structural problems".

On June 20, 2014, California Gov. Jerry Brown signed budget legislation that included $1.3 million for the bridge's restoration. The work was slated to be done in two phases—near-term stabilization followed by restoration. The bridge reopened to pedestrians in November 2021 following completion of the restoration work.

The Bridgeport Covered Bridge has the longest clear single span of any surviving wooden covered bridge in the world.

Historic landmark
The bridge is California Registered Historical Landmark No. 390, was designated as a National Historic Civil Engineering Landmark in 1970, and was listed in the National Register of Historic Places in 1971. There are four plaques at the site.

The State Historical Landmark plaque was placed in 1964. The landmark was rededicated in 2014. The inscription on the current plaque reads:
"Built in 1862 by David J. Wood with lumber from his mill in Sierra County. The covered bridge was part of the Virginia Turnpike Company toll road that served the northern mines and the Nevada Comstock Lode. The associated ranch and resources for rest and repair provided a necessary lifeline across the Sierra Nevada. Utilizing a unique combination truss and arch construction, Bridgeport Covered Bridge is one of the oldest housed spans in the western United States and the longest single span wooden covered bridge in the world."

The bridge was an important link in a freight-hauling route that stretched from the San Francisco Bay to Virginia City, Nevada and points beyond after the discovery of the Comstock Lode in 1859 sparked a mining boom in Nevada.  Steamboats carried freight  from the San Francisco Bay up the Sacramento River to Marysville, where it was loaded onto wagons for the trip across the Sierra Nevada via the Virginia Turnpike, and Henness Pass Road. The route across the bridge was ultimately eclipsed by the completion of the First transcontinental railroad as far as Reno in 1868 via Donner Pass, but it continued to serve nearby communities in the foothills until improved roads and bridges on other routes drew away most of the traffic.

Longest span

With the 2011 destruction of the Old Blenheim Bridge, the Bridgeport Covered Bridge is the undisputed longest-span wooden covered bridge still surviving.

See also
California Historical Landmarks in Nevada County
List of bridges documented by the Historic American Engineering Record in California
List of covered bridges in California
National Register of Historic Places listings in Nevada County, California

External links

Bridgeport Covered Bridge, at Nevada County, California website
Pictures of the Bridgeport Covered Bridge, at California Dept. of Transportation
South Yuba River State Park

Bridgeport Covered Bridge at the Covered Spans of Yesteryear website
South Yuba River Park Adventures, pictures, events, maps, wildflowers

References

Wooden bridges in California
Pedestrian bridges in California
Bridges in Nevada County, California
Bridges completed in 1862
California Historical Landmarks
Historic Civil Engineering Landmarks
Covered bridges on the National Register of Historic Places in California
National Register of Historic Places in Nevada County, California
Former road bridges in the United States
Historic American Buildings Survey in California
Historic American Engineering Record in California
Tourist attractions in Nevada County, California
1862 establishments in California
Road bridges on the National Register of Historic Places in California
Burr Truss bridges in the United States